Sukh signifies the following:

 "Sukh" means happiness in Sanskrit, and various dialects spoken in India such as Hindi, Sindhi and Punjabi which is opposite of "Dukh" Sadness
 the short name Sükh (meaning "axe") of a Mongolian revolutionary, see Damdin Sükhbaatar
 a businessman and politician in British Columbia, Canada, see Sukh Dhaliwal
 a historical ruler of the Kashmir region, see Raja Sukh Jivan
 a former member of the Parliament of India, see Sukh Ram
 a fictional deity in the Fighting Fantasy game, see Titan (world)
 Sukh Chungh (born 1992), Canadian football player
 Sukh Ojla (born 1984), English stand-up comedian

See also
 Sukhe (disambiguation)